Pannwitz is a surname. Notable people with the surname include:

Erika Pannwitz (1904–1975 ), German mathematician
Heinz Pannwitz (1911–1975),  German Gestapo and Schutzstaffel (SS) officer 
Helmuth von Pannwitz (1898–1947), German general
Rudolf Pannwitz (1881–1969), German writer, poet and philosopher